The 1908 United States presidential election was the 31st quadrennial presidential election, held on Tuesday, November 3, 1908. Secretary of War and Republican Party nominee William Howard Taft defeated three-time Democratic nominee William Jennings Bryan.

Popular incumbent President Theodore Roosevelt honored his promise not to seek a third term (or in this case, second elected term), and persuaded his close friend, Taft, to become his successor. With Roosevelt's support, Taft won the presidential nomination of the 1908 Republican National Convention on the first ballot. Having lost the 1904 election badly, the Democratic Party re-nominated Bryan, who had been defeated in 1896 and 1900 by Republican William McKinley. Despite his two previous defeats and the waning of the Free Silver issue, Bryan remained extremely popular among the more liberal and populist elements of the Democratic Party. The Republican Party would control the presidency until four years later, when Democrat Woodrow Wilson was elected.  

Bryan ran a vigorous campaign against the nation's business elite, but the Democrat suffered the worst loss of his three presidential campaigns in his percentage of both the popular and electoral vote. Taft won 51.6% of the popular vote and carried most states outside of the Solid South. Taft's triumph gave Republicans their fourth straight presidential election victory. Two third-party candidates, Eugene V. Debs of the Socialist Party and Eugene W. Chafin of the Prohibition Party, each took over 1% of the popular vote. This is the most recent election where the Republican Party won four presidential elections in a row.

Nominations

Republican Party nomination

Nominees

Candidates 

The Republican nomination contest marked the introduction of the presidential preference primary. The idea of the primary to nominate candidates was sponsored by anti-machine politicians such as New York Governor Charles Evans Hughes and Senator Albert B. Cummins. The first state to hold a presidential primary to select delegates to a national convention was Florida in 1904, when Democratic Party voters held a primary among uninstructed candidates for delegate. Early in 1908, the only two Republican contenders running nationwide campaigns for the presidential nomination were Secretary of War William Howard Taft and Governor Joseph B. Foraker, both of Ohio. In the nomination contest, four states held primaries to select national convention delegates. In Ohio, the state Republican Party held a primary on February 11. Candidates pledged to Taft were printed on the ballot in a Taft column, and candidates pledged to Foraker were printed in a column under his name. Taft won a resounding victory in Ohio. The three states holding primaries to select delegates without the preference component were split: California chose a slate of delegates that supported Taft; Wisconsin elected a slate that supported Wisconsin Senator Robert M. La Follette, Sr., and Pennsylvania elected a slate that supported its Senator Philander C. Knox.

The 1908 Republican Convention was held in Chicago between June 16 and 19. William Howard Taft was nominated with 702 votes to 68 for Knox, 67 for Hughes, 58 for Cannon, 40 for Fairbanks, 25 for La Follette, 16 for Foraker, 3 for President Roosevelt, and one abstention.

Representative James S. Sherman from New York received the vice-presidential nomination.

Democratic Party nomination

Nominees

Candidates 

As the 1908 election approached, William Jennings Bryan was the front-runner for the Democratic presidential nomination. Bryan's most formidable challenger for the nomination was Minnesota Governor John Albert Johnson. Johnson's rags-to-riches story, honesty, reformist credentials, and ability to win in a heavily Republican state made him popular within the Democratic Party. In March, the Minnesota Democratic State Convention endorsed Johnson for president. By the end of June, however, Bryan had amassed more than the requisite two-thirds of the delegates needed for nomination.

The 1908 Democratic National Convention was held in Denver between July 7 and 10. Johnson, aware of the fact that Bryan's nomination was a foregone conclusion, released his delegates, thereby allowing Bryan to win the nomination on the first ballot.

Bryan left the choice of vice-president to the delegates. John W. Kern from Indiana was unanimously declared the candidate for vice-president without a formal ballot after the names of Charles A. Towne, Archibald McNeil, and Clark Howell were withdrawn from consideration. Kern was a former state senator (1893-1897) and two-time gubernatorial candidate (1900 and 1904).

In response to nomination of Bryan and Kern, The New York Times disparagingly pointed out that the Democratic national ticket was consistent because "a man twice defeated for the Presidency was at the head of it, and a man twice defeated for governor of his state was at the tail of it."

Third parties and independents

People's Party nomination

Nominees 

In 1904 the national Populist Party ticket fared fairly well. Its total was twice the party's total in the previous presidential election, and in ten states, it received over 1% of the vote. It also offered 47 candidates for the House of Representatives, though the only ones elected were cross-endorsed by one of the major parties. The party remained in fusion with either the Democrats or the Republicans in many states.
 
The following three years were a trying time for the party. When Democrats began to call for the nomination of Bryan in 1908, western Populist leader Thomas Tibbles announced that the People's Party would probably not support him since he had gone into the hands of the Eastern business interests. Two months later, Nebraska Democrats decided in their state convention to end fusion with the Populists, but they changed their mind after an all-night conference. In the midterm elections the party only offered 10 candidates for House, and the Kansas People's Party officially disbanded in December when that state party's leader announced that he was joining the Republicans.

By late 1907, many Populists were hoping that Thomas Watson would agree to run for president again. The previous three years had been unusual for Watson. He gave a speech to a gathering of farmers in Greensborough, Georgia and while preparing for supper, the house where he was staying was burned. In mid-1906, Watson called on Georgia Populists to vote for Hoke Smith for governor in the Democratic primary, which fueled speculation that Watson was thinking of returning to the Democrats. In early 1907, Watson started a network of Populist-leaning publications to keep the party's principles alive; Tibbles was chosen to serve as the chief editor. One month later, someone fired shots into the Watsons' house in Augusta. He had an altercation with an African-American porter on a train; when the porter said that he was unable to increase the train's speed, Watson hit the man in the face with the cap of his cane.

The People's Party National Committee met on November 26, 1907, to make preparations for the 1908 national convention. National chairman James Ferriss indicated that Thomas Watson was the front runner for the nomination, saying that the party hoped to forge an alliance with one or more of the other minor parties, including possibly the Independence League or the Prohibitionists. In early 1908, however, at least one member of the national committee believed that Senator Robert La Follette of Wisconsin would win the Populist nomination.

On the first day of the convention, the delegation from Nebraska worked to adjourn the convention; they had already decided to support Bryan if he became the Democratic nominee. They managed to delay the official organization of the convention all day. One of their delegates, A.M. Walling of Nebraska, told the New York Times "we shall bolt if the convention attempts to nominate Thomas E. Watson, or any one else. We are not alone, for we have assurances that Minnesota, Georgia, and possibly Michigan and Kansas will walk out when we do".
 
The convention was organized on the second day and completed all its relevant business. Watson supporters chose George A. Honnecker of New Jersey to serve as the permanent chairman, defeating the Bryan supporters' choice, Jacob Coxey. The platform called for inflation of the currency, public ownership of railroads, telephones, and telegraphs, labor legislation, and a ban on futures gambling. When the time for nominations began, a schism took place; Watson's name was placed in nomination, and the Nebraska delegation bolted. They were followed by T.J. Weighan, the sole delegate from Minnesota. Watson was then nominated for president; his running mate was Samuel Williams of Indiana.

Socialist Party nomination

Nominees

Candidates 

The radical members of the party supported giving the nomination to Bill Haywood. Debs' health was in question until Ben Hanford, a member of the New York delegation, read a letter from Debs stating that he was in good health and would give his support to whoever won the nomination. Seymour Stedman, an opponent of Debs, proposed Algie Martin Simons, who had the support of the right-wing in the party, for the nomination. Victor L. Berger proposed Carl D. Thompson for the nomination and it was seconded by Winfield R. Gaylord and Carolyn Lloyd Strobell. James F. Carey was nominated by Ida Crouch-Hazlett. Max S. Hayes nomination was seconded by Alfred Wagenknecht. Phillip H. Callery nominated Debs on May 14, 1908, and it was seconded by John Spargo and he won the nomination on the first ballot with 159 votes out of the 198 cast. A motion by Berger and Stedman to make the selection unanimous was approved. Carey's name was put up for the vice-presidential nomination by the Massachusetts, Minnesota, and Montana delegations, but he declined to run and Caleb Lipscomb also declined. Hanford won the vice-presidential selection with 106 votes on the first ballot and was later made unanimous. Debs' campaign was managed by J. Mahlon Barnes. This was the first time that a candidate besides Debs had been nominated for the Socialist presidential nomination.

Lincoln Steffens initially believed that Debs was not suitable for the presidency, but later told Brand Whitlock, the mayor of Toledo, Ohio, to vote for Debs after Steffens interviewed Debs and Berger. Haywood fundraised for the purchase of a train, which had over 200,000 contributors, that was later named the Red Special. Debs' train left on August 30, 1908, and traveled over 9,000 miles and gave 187 speeches over twenty-five days. Twenty-two million copies of Appeal to Reason were distributed during the campaign and the newspaper gained 50,000 subscribers. 

Theodore Roosevelt believed that the Socialists would take progressive votes away from Taft and stated that Debs' speeches were "mere pieces of the literature of criminal violence". Samuel Gompers, the president of the American Federation of Labor and who had endorsed Bryan, criticized Debs accusing him of receiving secret funding for his train from the Republicans. The Socialists published the names of every contributor to the train fund and the amount they donated and also challenged Gompers to a debate, but he refused. Former President Grover Cleveland and Chicago Tribune predicted that the Socialists would receive over one million votes.

Debs hoped to receive over a million votes, but only received 420,852 votes which was a 20,000 vote increase from the 1904 election. Debs stated that the reason for the small increase was due to Democrats who had supported him in 1904 over Parker had voted for Bryan and that those who remained were pure socialist votes.

Socialist Labor Party nomination

Nominees 

The Socialist Labor Party met in New York, New York from July 2 to July 5 in Arlington Hall, St. Mark's Place. While increasingly dwarfed by the growing membership of the Socialist Party led by Eugene Debs and Bill Haywood, Daniel De Leon and his compatriots remained committed to maintaining their separate course, considering Debs and his platform as "reactionary". An attempt was made to depose Leon from his position of editor of the Party's papers in favor of a more moderate candidate, fearing that Leon's writings were alienating voters who might otherwise be sympathetic to their cause. The report was overwhelmingly voted down after Leon spoke in defense of his conduct as the Party's editor, with a rival report being adopted praising his leadership. When it came time for the nominations, Leon personally nominated Martin Preston of Nevada, who was currently serving a twenty-five year sentence for the murder of Anton Silva. While noting that Preston was only 32 at the time, Leon remarked that "it was for the working people to elect Preston, and if he was elected he would be seated". Preston's nomination was ratified unanimously, with Donald Munro of Virginia winning in a contest against Arthur S. Dower of Texas for the vice presidential nomination. The nominations were later formalized at Cooper Union following the close of the convention.

Only days later however Martin Preston replied in a telegram that he could not accept the Presidential nomination, a declination that had not been expected nor prepared for. August Gillhaus of New York was later then nominated in Preston's stead.

Prohibition Party nomination

Nominees 

The Prohibition Party met in Columbus, Ohio on July 14 and 15 to nominate their presidential ticket. Eugene Chafin was nominated on the third ballot in an open contest. When the runner-up for the Presidential nomination William Palmore, a Methodist Minister from Missouri and Editor of the St. Louis Christian Advocate, declined his nomination for the Vice Presidency, the convention hurriedly allowed for a new set of nominations and another ballot. Aaron Watkins of Ohio would win a majority on the first ballot.

Independence Party nomination

Nominees

Candidates 

Disappointed with his performance in the 1904 Democratic presidential nomination campaign, and disillusioned as to his chances of successfully attaining it in 1908, William Randolph Hearst decided to run instead on the ticket of a third party of his own making. Originally borne from the Municipal Ownership League, a vehicle for Hearst's ultimately unsuccessful bid for the mayoralty of New York in 1905, it was Hearst's intention to fuse it with the remnants of the Populist Party led by Thomas Watson, a former Representative from Georgia who had been its presidential nominee in 1904. However, these intentions were dashed when every candidate that the Independence Party put forth in elections held in New York was elected except Hearst himself, despite an endorsement by the Democratic Party. Devastated, Hearst declared his intention never again to be a candidate.

While Hearst would no longer be the nominee, he fully intended to exercise influence at Independence Party's convention; the platform itself was in large part a statement of his own views. With its candidates nominated, the party's purpose was changed from being a path for Hearst's presidential ambitions to being an instrument of his wrath. Through the influence of his papers and generous financial donations, Hearst hoped that the Independence ticket would draw away votes from William Jennings Bryan and lead to his defeat against Taft, a personal vendetta for Bryan failing to support his own bid for the Presidency in 1904.

General election

Campaign 

With the Free Silver issue no longer dominant, Bryan campaigned on a progressive platform attacking "government by privilege." His campaign slogan, "Shall the People Rule?", was featured on numerous posters and campaign memorabilia. However, Taft undercut Bryan's liberal support by accepting some of his reformist ideas, and Roosevelt's progressive policies blurred the distinctions between the parties. Republicans also used the slogan "Vote for Taft now, you can vote for Bryan anytime," a sarcastic reference to Bryan's two failed previous presidential campaigns.

The Socialist candidate, Eugene Debs, embarked on an ambitious whistle-stop tour aboard a train nicknamed the Red Special, giving speeches regarding the Socialist cause across the country. The exertion of the tour exhausted Debs, and at certain points his brother Theodore - who bore a great resemblance to Eugene - substituted for him to allow the candidate to rest.

Businessmen continued to support the Republican Party, and Bryan failed to secure the support of labor. As a result, Bryan ended up with the worst of his three defeats in the national popular vote. He lost almost all the northern states to Taft and the popular vote by 8 percentage points.

This would be Bryan's last campaign for the presidency, although he would remain a popular figure within the Democratic Party and in 1912 would play a key role in securing the presidential nomination for Woodrow Wilson. Charles W. Bryan, William's brother, would become the (losing) Democratic nominee for Vice President in 1924. Bryan's 162 electoral votes from this election, combined with his 155 and 176 electoral votes from 1900 and 1896 respectively, make him the person with the most electoral votes never to be president.

Results 

Forty-six states participated, as Oklahoma had joined the Union less than a year before. Bryan won forty-eight counties in the new state of Oklahoma. The most important increase in number of counties carried by Bryan was in the West South Central section, in part due to the vote of newly admitted Oklahoma.

Of the 2,858 counties making returns, Taft won in 1,494 (52.27%) while Bryan carried 1,355 (47.41%). Nine (0.31%) counties recorded more votes cast for "Other(s)" than either of the two-party candidates, whilst twenty-eight counties (0.97%) recorded zero votes due to being inhabited either by Native Americans who would not gain full citizenship for sixteen years, or by disenfranchised southern African-Americans. Taft had a majority in 1,325 counties while Bryan had a majority in 1,204 counties.

By carrying 1,355 counties, Bryan won more counties than he had in 1900 (1,340), but he did not reach or surpass the number of counties he had won in 1896 (1,559). While Bryan won more counties than McKinley in 1896, Bryan failed to carry more counties than the Republican candidate in 1900 or 1904. Compared with his strength in previous elections, however, Bryan carried 69 counties in 1908 which had not been Democratic in either 1896 or 1900.

Bryan increased the area carried by Democrats in every part of the country except New England and the South. He doubled the number of Democratic counties in Wisconsin and won more counties in Indiana than were carried by plurality vote by the Democrats in any election in the Fourth Party System except 1912. He made decided gains in Missouri and in his home state of Nebraska, besides achieving notable victories in Colorado and Nevada. However, in four Western states (Washington, Oregon, Wyoming, and North Dakota), there was not one Democratic county. This was true likewise of Michigan, Delaware, and each of the New England states.

The total vote increased greatly, by more than a million vis-à-vis 1904. Each party shared in the increase, but whereas Taft had nearly fifty thousand more than Theodore Roosevelt, Bryan had nearly 1,500,000 more votes than Alton Parker had garnered, and more than in either of his previous campaigns.

It was noticeable that the "other" vote was only about seven thousand less than four years earlier. The "other" vote was a plurality in nine counties in the states of Georgia and Texas.

The size of the vote cast for the defeated Bryan in 1908 is clear evidence of perhaps the most striking feature of the American presidential vote. In this third attempt at the presidency, and in an election following one in which the nominee of his party polled only five million votes, Bryan had heavy support in every section of the country, and in every state. Moreover, nearly two-thirds of the vote cast for Bryan was from the fifteen states of the (Northeastern) Mid-Atlantic, East North Central, and West North Central sections, in which the Democratic candidate carried only one state (Nebraska).

Despite all conclusions as to predominant sentiment in the different sections and its economic, social, and political causes, there was a national vote cast for Bryan, and it was urban as well as rural; it was eastern, western, southern, and northern. Everywhere the Democratic Party was the minority party, and it was not hopeless, nor was it helpless. It was the agency for the expression of the opposition of almost six and a half million voters.
According to Historian George E. Mowry:
 What was especially significant in the election was the continued growth in the strength of the Democratic party and the success of the so-called progressive Republican candidates in the Midwest. The Republicans had not only lost seats in the House of Representatives but they had also lost governors in Ohio, Indiana, Minnesota, and North Dakota, all of which voted for Taft. In Wisconsin, Iowa, Nebraska, and even in Kansas self-announced progressive Republicans, who had previously defeated conservatives in the primaries, were more successful in beating their Democratic rivals. The election, The New York Times reported, had been punctuated with "independent voting." A closer analysis of the returns indicated that the voter in the Midwest had expressed his independence mostly from standpat Republicanism symbolized by the control of Speaker Cannon in the House and Aldrich in the Senate.

As of 2022, this is the last of only two elections when Kansas and Nebraska have not voted for the same candidate. The election of 1908 was the last election in which a Republican won the presidency without winning Nebraska, and the last in which Nebraska voted differently to Kansas and North Dakota. As of 2020, Bryan was the fifth of seven presidential nominees to win a significant number of electoral votes in at least three elections, the others being Thomas Jefferson, Henry Clay, Andrew Jackson, Grover Cleveland, Franklin D. Roosevelt, and Richard Nixon. Of these, Jackson, Cleveland, and Roosevelt also won the popular vote in at least three elections. Clay and Bryan are the only two candidates to lose the presidency three times.  

Source (Popular Vote): 

Source (Electoral Vote):

Geography of results

Cartographic gallery

Results by state

Close states 

Margin of victory less than 1% (34 electoral votes):
 Missouri, 0.09% (629 votes)
 Maryland, 0.25% (605 votes)

Margin of victory less than 5% (46 electoral votes):
 Colorado, 1.12% (2,951 votes)
 Indiana, 1.49% (10,731 votes)
 Nebraska, 1.54% (4,102 votes)
 Kentucky, 1.71% (8,381 votes)
 Nevada, 1.78% (437 votes)
 Montana, 4.37% (3,007 votes)
 Oklahoma, 4.66% (11,889 votes)

Margin of victory between 5% and 10% (60 electoral votes):
 Delaware, 6.16% (2,959 votes)
 Tennessee, 6.86% (17,631 votes)
 Ohio, 6.20% (69,591 votes)
 North Carolina, 8.73% (22,041 votes)
 Kansas, 9.58% (36,007 votes)

Tipping point state:
 West Virginia, 10.25% (26,451 votes)

Statistics 
Counties with Highest Percent of Vote (Republican)
 Leslie County, Kentucky 92.96%
 Unicoi County, Tennessee 92.77%
 Sevier County, Tennessee 91.44%
 Keweenaw County, Michigan 90.56%
 Johnson County, Tennessee 90.21%

Counties with Highest Percent of Vote (Democratic)
 Hampton County, South Carolina 100.00%
 King County, Texas 100.00%
 Garza County, Texas 100.00%
 Loving County, Texas 100.00%
 Wilcox County, Alabama 99.81%

Counties with Highest Percent of Vote (Other)
 Terry County, Texas 100.00%
 Glascock County, Georgia 69.97%
 McDuffie County, Georgia 64.31%
 Lincoln County, Georgia 61.65%
 Oconee County, Georgia 56.21%

Campaign memorabilia

See also 
 President of the United States
 History of the United States (1865–1918)
 1908 United States House of Representatives elections
 1908–09 United States Senate elections
 Inauguration of William Howard Taft

Notes

References

Further reading 
 Coletta, Paolo E. The Presidency of William Howard Taft (1973) pp. 1–21.
 Coletta, Paolo E.  "The Election of 1908" in Arthur M. Schlesinger, Jr. and Fred L Israel, eds., History of American Presidential Elections: 1789-1968 (1971) 3: 2049–2131.  online
 Coletta, Paolo E. William Jennings Bryan. I: Political Evangelist, 1860-1908 (U of Nebraska Press, 1964)
 
 Fahey, James J. "Building Populist Discourse: An Analysis of Populist Communication in American Presidential Elections, 1896–2016." Social Science Quarterly 102.4 (2021): 1268-1288. online
 Glad, Paul W. The trumpet soundeth; William Jennings Bryan and his democracy, 1896–1912 (1960) online

 Korzi, Michael J., "William Howard Taft, the 1908 Election, and the Future of the American Presidency," Congress and the Presidency, 43 (May–August 2016), 227–54.  
 Mowry, George E. The Era of Theodore Roosevelt, 1900-1912 (1958). online 
  Sarasohn, David. The Party of Reform: Democrats in the Progressive Era (UP of Mississippi, 1989), 35–58.

Primary sources 
 Chester, Edward W  A guide to political platforms (1977) online
 Porter, Kirk H. and Donald Bruce Johnson, eds. National party platforms, 1840-1964 (1965) online 1840-1956

External links 

 Presidential Election of 1908: A Resource Guide from the Library of Congress
 The Republican Campaign Textbook 1908
 Tim Davenport, "Red Special Across America," The Debs Project blog, June 23, 2019, Complete list of Debs tour stops.
 1908 popular vote by counties

 Election of 1908 in Counting the Votes

 
Presidency of William Howard Taft
William Howard Taft
November 1908 events